Milton Orkopoulos (born 22 July 1957) is an Australian former state politician and convicted sex offender. A member of the New South Wales Legislative Assembly from 1999 to 2006, Orkopoulos was appointed Minister for Aboriginal Affairs and Minister Assisting the Premier on Citizenship in August 2005.

In November 2006, Premier of New South Wales Morris Iemma dismissed him as a Minister and of a member of the Australian Labor Party after he was charged with child sex and other offences. The following week, he resigned as MP for the state electorate of Swansea. On 14 March 2008, Orkopoulos was convicted on charges relating to child sex offences and the supply of drugs. In May 2008, he was sentenced to 13 years 9 months in jail.

Early life 
Orkopoulos, an Australian of Greek descent briefly trained as a nurse before studying arts at the University of Newcastle, though he did not graduate. He went on to work for BHP and as an electorate officer for MPs Peter Morris, Don Bowman and Jill Hall. He married and had a child.

Political career 
From 1995 until 1999, Orkopoulos represented the ALP on Lake Macquarie City Council. In March 1999, he was elected to represent Swansea in the Legislative Assembly for Labor, and joined the Socialist Left faction. In August 2005, he was promoted to the front bench, serving in the low-profile portfolios of Aboriginal Affairs and Citizenship.

Former NSW Premier, Nathan Rees, served as his Chief of Staff before joining the staff of Premier Morris Iemma in 2006.

Criminal history 
On 5 November 2006, police minister John Watkins was informed by police commissioner Ken Moroney that Orkopoulos was about to be charged with child sex offences. Moroney later explained that the Orkopoulos case "is an issue that would be discussed in the normal course of events between us." The call, which resulted in the premier's office knowing that the arrest of a senior colleague was imminent, raised questions as to the political independence of the New South Wales Police. Legal commentator Richard Ackland wrote in the Sydney Morning Herald that "I can't think of a solid reason why third parties should be told by the police that they are about to nab someone important."

On 7 November 2006, Orkopoulos was arrested and charged with 30 offences including involvement in child prostitution, sexual assault and supplying illegal drugs. He was charged among other things with assaulting two underage boys and a third young male, and using taxpayers' money to pay a teenage boy to have sex with him.

Premier Morris Iemma immediately sacked him from Cabinet, and he was also expelled from the Labor Party. Orkopoulos denied the charges but indicated that he would not contest his Swansea electorate at the 2007 state election. He resigned from parliament on 13 November 2006 and reportedly attempted suicide the next day.

The government also passed legislation to suspend or remove parliamentary pension entitlements for any member who resigns when charged with serious crimes prior to the resolution of charges. The provisions of the legislation permitted it to be applied retrospectively to Orkopoulos.

Further charges were laid against Orkopoulos on 16 April 2007. On 14 March 2008, he was found guilty of 28 offences relating to sexual assault of a minor, indecent assault and supplying heroin and cannabis. On 21 May 2008, Orkopoulos was sentenced to 13 years and 11 months in jail, with a non-parole period of 9 years and 3 months. In March 2009, he lodged a challenge against his conviction in the New South Wales Court of Criminal Appeal. On 25 August 2009, the NSW Court of Criminal Appeal rejected Orkopoulos' appeal against his conviction but reduced his maximum sentence to 13 years and eight months (instead of the 13 years and 11 months sentence by the trial court) with a non-parole period of nine years.

In January 2017, Orkopoulos' application for parole was refused on the grounds that he had failed to attend rehabilitation.

He was released on parole in late December 2019. The conditions of his release included being electronically monitored and not approaching his victims. In January 2020, while on parole, Orkopoulos was charged with two counts of failing to meet his reporting obligations.He pleaded guilty to those offences and avoided a prison term when his lawyer, Omar Juweinat pointed out an anomaly in the sentencing laws. On 15 June 2020, Orkopoulos was arrested and questioned by NSW Police over further historical sex offence allegations.

See also
 Child sexual abuse in Australia
 List of Australian criminals

References

 

1957 births
Living people
21st-century Australian criminals
Australian drug traffickers
Australian Labor Party members of the Parliament of New South Wales
Australian people convicted of child sexual abuse
Australian people convicted of indecent assault
Australian people of Greek descent
Australian politicians convicted of crimes
Australian prisoners and detainees
Criminals from New South Wales
Members of the New South Wales Legislative Assembly
Australian people convicted of drug offences
Politicians convicted of sex offences
Place of birth missing (living people)
Prisoners and detainees of New South Wales
University of Newcastle (Australia) alumni
21st-century Australian politicians
Crime in Oceania
Sexual violence in Oceania